Joseph Weld (1651–1712), of Bracon Ash, Norfolk, was an English Member of Parliament. He represented Bury St Edmunds (UK Parliament constituency) from 26 March 1709 to 18 January 1712.

References

British MPs 1708–1710
British MPs 1710–1713
1651 births
1712 deaths
People from South Norfolk (district)